Humberto de Jesús Sierra Sánchez (born July 21, 1960, in Envigado, Colombia) is a Colombian football coach and former player who played as a midfielder.

Coaching career
Sierra was an assistant coach on the staff of the Mexican men's national soccer team that defeated Germany in the group stage of the 2018 World Cup before advancing to the knockout round. In 2019 he served as the head coach of Club Deportivo La Equidad Seguros (also known as "La Equidad"), a Colombian football team based in Bogotá and playing in the Categoría Primera A (also known as "Liga Águila"). In October 2020, Sierra Sánchez was hired to join the coaching staff for his hometown team, Deportivo Independiente Medellín (also a member of Liga Águila Primera A).

Teams
 América de Cali 1980–1984
 Atlético Nacional 1985–1987
 Independiente Medellín 1988
 Deportes La Serena 1989–1990
 Independiente Medellín 1991–1993

Honours
'América de Cali
 Colombian Primera División: 1982, 1983 and 1984

References
 

1960 births
Living people
People from Envigado
Sportspeople from Antioquia Department
Colombian footballers
Association football midfielders
Chilean Primera División players
Independiente Medellín footballers
Atlético Nacional footballers
América de Cali footballers
Deportes La Serena footballers
La Equidad managers
Independiente Medellín managers
Colombian expatriate footballers
Colombian expatriate sportspeople in Chile
Expatriate footballers in Chile